As a solution to the Bertrand paradox in economics, it has been suggested that each firm produces a somewhat differentiated product, and consequently faces a demand curve that is downward-sloping for all levels of the firm's price.

An increase in a competitor's price is represented as an increase (for example, an upward shift) of the firm's demand curve.

As a result, when a competitor raises price, generally a firm can also raise its own price and increase its profits.

Calculating the differentiated Bertrand model
q1 = firm 1's demand, *q1≥0
q2 = firm 2's demand, *q1≥0
A1 = Constant in equation for firm 1's demand
A2 = Constant in equation for firm 2's demand
a1 = slope coefficient for firm 1's price
a2 = slope coefficient for firm 2's price
p1 = firm 1's price level pr unit
p2 = firm 2's price level pr unit
b1 = slope coefficient for how much firm 2's price affects firm 1's demand
b2 = slope coefficient for how much firm 1's price affects firm 2's demand
q1=A1-a1*p1+b1*p2
q2=A2-a2*p2+b2*p1

The above figure presents the best response functions of the firms, which are complements to each other.

Uses
Merger simulation models ordinarily assume differentiated Bertrand competition within a market that includes the merging firms.

See also
Bertrand competition
Bertrand paradox (economics)
Oligopoly theory

External sources

 Oligoply Theory made Simple, Chapter 6 of Surfing Economics by Huw Dixon.

Competition (economics)
Oligopoly